City Centre Mirdif  is a shopping mall in the residential area of Mirdif, in Dubai, United Arab Emirates. It opened on 26 March 2010, and is developed and managed by Majid Al Futtaim Properties. City Centre Mirdif has a gross leasable area of 196,000 m2 and houses 465 retail stores.

Stores
Stores at the City Centre Mirdif include Emax (electronics retailer), Hamleys (toy retailer), Clas Ohlson (home improvement store), Boots, Areej (cosmetics and perfumes), VaVaVoom (beauty products and fragrances), Nayomi (lingerie), Nine West, Karen Millen, New Look, Miss Selfridge, H&M, American Eagle Outfitters, Zara, Pierre Cardin, Max Value, The North Face, Timberland, Armani Jeans, Hackett (British designer menswear), Sun & Sand Sports, Nike, Early Learning Centre, Destination Maternity (maternity fashion and accessories), Mothercare, Mamas & Papas, Bhs Kids, Marina (home furnishings), Lakeland (kitchenware), Virgin Megastore, Jumbo Electronics, Bose, Canon, Etisalat, Paris Gallery (offering fragrances from Agent Provocateur, Boss, Boucheron, Burberry, Bvlgari, Chanel, Christian Dior, Dolce & Gabbana, Gucci, Hermes, Jean Paul Gautier, Kenzo, Lacoste, Paloma Picasso, Vera Wang, and Yves Saint Laurent, watches by Cartier, Diesel, DKNY, Just Cavalli, and Versace).

Dining
City Centre Mirdif houses over 80 restaurants and cafés. Restaurants include Abdel Wahab, Uno Pizzeria & Grill, Japengo, Texas Roadhouse, and Gazebo. Two food courts offer 34 outlets, restaurant precincts, coffee shops and casual dining.

VOX Cinemas
A 10-screen cinema featuring two VOX GOLD Premium screens with VOX GOLD lounge and VOX 4DX sensory experience.

See also
List of shopping malls in Dubai

References

External links

 City Centre Mirdif website

 

2010 establishments in the United Arab Emirates
Shopping malls established in 2010
Shopping malls in Dubai
RTKL Associates buildings